João António Ferreira Resende Alves (born 5 December 1952) is a Portuguese football manager and former player.

A skilled attacking midfielder, he was considered one of the best Portuguese players of his generation, and earned the nickname Luvas Pretas from the black gloves he used to wear while playing following in the style of his grandfather Carlos Alves.

During his career he represented mainly, with equal individual and team success, Benfica and Boavista, also coaching the latter club on three separate occasions.

Playing career

Club
Born in Albergaria-a-Velha, Aveiro District, Alves started playing at youth level for A.D. Sanjoanense, being recruited in 1969 by S.L. Benfica. His first professional team was Varzim S.C. in the 1972–73 season followed by C.D. Montijo, the latter being his Primeira Liga experience.

Alves moved to his first major club, Boavista FC, for the 1974–75 campaign, where he first showed more of his talent, earning him a transfer to Spain's UD Salamanca where he remained two more years. He then returned to Portugal and Benfica, only to move after one year to Paris Saint-Germain FC.

Failing to impress in France, Alves immediately moved back to the Estádio da Luz, where he would play for the next three seasons. He then re-joined Boavista, ending his career during 1984–85 at the age of 32 to become the latter team's coach.

Alves won two national championships for Benfica (1981 and 1983) and four Portuguese Cups (two for Boavista, in 1975 and 1976, and two with the former side, in 1981 and 1983). He also played for them in the 1982–83 UEFA Cup final, losing on aggregate to R.S.C. Anderlecht of Belgium.

International
Alves won 36 caps for Portugal (11 for Boavista, eight for Salamanca and 17 for Benfica), scoring three goals. His debut took place on 13 November 1974 in a 0–3 friendly loss to Switzerland, and his final match was on 27 April 1983, in a 0–5 loss against the Soviet Union for the UEFA Euro 1984 qualifiers.

|}

Coaching career
Alves became a coach after finishing his player career, managing Boavista on three separate occasions, C.F. Estrela da Amadora (leading the Amadora team to an historical 1990 Cup of Portugal triumph), Vitória de Guimarães, C.F. Os Belenenses, Salamanca, S.C. Campomaiorense, S.C. Farense, Académica de Coimbra and Leixões SC. In 1996–97, he was one of three managers as former side Salamanca returned to La Liga after a second-place finish.

After three years out of coaching, he returned to Benfica in 2007, to be in charge of its under-18 team. Two years later he returned to senior football, signing with Switzerland's Servette FC and achieving promotion to the Super League in his second season.

On 28 November 2011, following Swiss Cup elimination at the hands of FC Biel-Bienne (0–3 away loss), Alves was relieved of his duties. However, following poor results achieved by his successor and the club's takeover by Hugh Quennec, he was reinstated as manager in April 2012: in the final five games of the campaign results improved, with the team achieving four wins and one draw – this included a 2–1 win over eventual champions FC Basel, which ended Servette's streak of 17 consecutive defeats against that opponent as well as ending their 26-match unbeaten run – and the side eventually qualified for the UEFA Europa League.

On 9 October 2018, after six years of inactivity, Alves returned for another spell as Académica coach, with the club now in the LigaPro. He left at the end of the season, and came back to management on 9 January 2020 with C.D. Cova da Piedade, last-placed in the same league. They were relegated in May when the campaign was cancelled due to the COVID-19 pandemic, and he openly attacked the Liga Portuguesa de Futebol Profissional for the decision.

Managerial statistics
{| class="wikitable" style="text-align: center"
|-
!rowspan=2| Team
!rowspan=2| From
!rowspan=2| To
!colspan=8| Record
|-
!
!
!
!
!
!
!
!
|-
| Boavista
| August 1990
| November 1990

|-
| Estrela Amadora
| July 1988
| June 1990

|-
| Boavista
| August 1990
| November 1990

|-
| Vitória Guimarães
| January 1991
| May 1992

|-
| Estrela Amadora
| July 1993
| May 1994

|-
| Belenenses
| October 1994
| May 1996

|-
| Salamanca
| July 1996
| September 1996

|-
| Boavista
| November 1996
| 12 January 1997

|-
| Campomaiorense
| October 1997
| 29 November 1998

|-
| Farense
| February 1999
| January 2000

|-
| Académica
| December 2000
| 3 December 2002

|-
| Estrela Amadora
| 6 March 2003
| 11 November 2003

|-
| Leixões
| 5 November 2003
| 12 January 2004

|-
| Servette
| 7 October 2009
| 28 November 2011

|-
| Servette
| 25 April 2012
| 4 September 2012

|-
! colspan=3| Career totals

Honours

Player
Boavista
Taça de Portugal: 1974–75, 1975–76

Benfica
Primeira Liga: 1980–81, 1982–83
Taça de Portugal: 1980–81, 1982–83
Supertaça Cândido de Oliveira: 1980

Manager
Estrela da Amadora
Taça de Portugal: 1989–90	
Segunda Liga: 1992–93

Individual
Portuguese Footballer of the Year: 1975

References

External links

1952 births
Living people
People from Albergaria-a-Velha
Portuguese footballers
Association football midfielders
Primeira Liga players
Liga Portugal 2 players
S.L. Benfica footballers
Varzim S.C. players
C.D. Montijo players
Boavista F.C. players
La Liga players
UD Salamanca players
Ligue 1 players
Paris Saint-Germain F.C. players
Portugal international footballers
Portuguese expatriate footballers
Expatriate footballers in Spain
Expatriate footballers in France
Portuguese expatriate sportspeople in Spain
Portuguese expatriate sportspeople in France
Portuguese football managers
Primeira Liga managers
Liga Portugal 2 managers
Boavista F.C. managers
C.F. Estrela da Amadora managers
Vitória S.C. managers
C.F. Os Belenenses managers
S.C. Campomaiorense managers
S.C. Farense managers
Associação Académica de Coimbra – O.A.F. managers
Leixões S.C. managers
Segunda División managers
UD Salamanca managers
Servette FC managers
Portuguese expatriate football managers
Expatriate football managers in Spain
Expatriate football managers in Switzerland
Portuguese expatriate sportspeople in Switzerland
Sportspeople from Aveiro District